The Democrats Union (DS) was a political party in Latvia in the inter-war period.

History
The party won six seats in the 1920 Constitutional Assembly elections, becoming the joint fourth-largest party in the Assembly. It did not run in the 1922 elections, and although it returned for the 1925 elections, the party received just 0.2% of the vote. It did not contest any further elections.

References

Defunct political parties in Latvia